Mansaray is a Sierra Leonean surname. Notable people with the surname include:

Binta Mansaray, Sierra Leonean United Nations official
Chernor Mansaray (born 1976), Sierra Leonean footballer
Jusufu Mansaray, Sierra Leonean politician
Minkailu Mansaray, Sierra Leonean politician
Sidique Mansaray (born 1980), Sierra Leonean footballer
Tejan Amadu Mansaray, Sierra Leonean politician